Astroloma is an endemic Australian genus of around 20 species of flowering plants in the family Ericaceae. The majority of the species are endemic to Western Australia, but a few species occur in New South Wales, Victoria, Tasmania and South Australia.

The genus was first described by Robert Brown in 1810 in Prodromus Florae Novae Hollandiae.

The name Astroloma is derived from the Ancient Greek words astron = a star and loma = a fringe, alluding to five tufts of hairs which form a star at the bottom of the inside of the floral tube.

Species include:

Astroloma baxteri A.Cunn. ex DC.
Astroloma cataphractum A.J.G.Wilson MS
Astroloma ciliatum (Lindl.) Druce
Astroloma compactum R.Br.
Astroloma conostephioides (Sond.) F.Muell. ex Benth. - Flame heath
Astroloma drummondii Sond.
Astroloma epacridis (DC.) Druce
Astroloma foliosum Sond. - Candle cranberry
Astroloma glaucescens Sond.
Astroloma humifusum (Cav.) R.Br. - Cranberry heath
Astroloma macrocalyx Sond.
Astroloma microcalyx Sond.
Astroloma microdonta Benth.
Astroloma microphyllum Stschegl.
Astroloma pallidum R.Br.
Astroloma pedicellatum A.J.G.Wilson MS
Astroloma pinifolium (R.Br.) Benth. - Pine heath
Astroloma recurvum 
 Astroloma stomarrhena Sond.
 Astroloma xerophyllum Sond.

References

 
Ericales of Australia
Endemic flora of Australia
Ericaceae genera